Pleasant Grove Township is a township in Greenwood County, in the U.S. state of Kansas.  As of the 2000 census, its population was 52.

Geography
According to the United States Geological Survey (USGS), it contains two cemeteries: Neal and Rocky Ford.

The streams of Cedar Creek, Fancy Creek, Kuntz Branch, Tar Creek and Walnut Creek run through this township.

References
 USGS Geographic Names Information System (GNIS)

External links
 US-Counties.com
 City-Data.com

Townships in Greenwood County, Kansas
Townships in Kansas